Tyler Van Dyke (born March 1, 2001) is an American football quarterback for the Miami Hurricanes.

High school career
Van Dyke attended Suffield Academy in Suffield, Connecticut. Over his final two high school seasons he had 4,600 passing yards and 39 passing touchdowns. He committed to the University of Miami to play college football.

College career
As a true freshman at Miami in 2020, Van Dyke appeared in two games as a backup to D'Eriq King. He entered 2021 as a backup to King before becoming the starter after King suffered an injury. In his first start against Central Connecticut State he completed 10 of 11 passes for 270 yards and three touchdowns.

Statistics

References

External links

Miami Hurricanes bio

Living people
Players of American football from Connecticut
American football quarterbacks
Miami Hurricanes football players
2001 births